Uncle Willy may refer to:

Fictional characters
 Uncle Willy in the 1948 American comedy film The Return of October
 Uncle Willy in the 1956 American musical comedy film High Society
 Uncle Willy in the 1995 American horror comedy film Demon Knight

Other uses
 "Uncle Willy", a 1935 short story by William Faulkner
 Bill Luxton (actor) (1927–2019), Uncle Willy of the Willy and Floyd comedy team
 "Uncle Willy", a song by The Crescendos on the 1988 compilation album Pebbles, Volume 24

See also
Uncle Billy (disambiguation)
Uncle Willie, a character from the American comic series Moon Mullins